Melissa Linn Berman Bjånesøy (born 18 April 1992) is an American-born Norwegian football striker, currently playing for Stabæk in Norway's Toppserien. She previously played for IL Sandviken. In the 2011 season she scored ten goals to help Sandviken avoid relegation.

Career
An Under-19 international, she was the top scorer of the 2011 U-19 European Championship with seven goals. She scored in all five games from the group stage to the final, which Norway lost 8–1 to Germany.

Veteran national coach Even Pellerud selected Bjånesøy in Norway's squad for UEFA Women's Euro 2013 in Sweden. In the final at Friends Arena, she was an unused substitute as Norway lost 1–0 to Germany.

International goals

Career statistics

References

External links

 
 

1992 births
Living people
Norwegian women's footballers
Norway women's youth international footballers
Norway women's international footballers
Toppserien players
Stabæk Fotball Kvinner players
SK Brann Kvinner players
Soccer players from Chicago
2015 FIFA Women's World Cup players
Women's association football forwards